Utku Asuroglu (born 1986 in Istanbul, Turkey) is a Turkish composer of acoustic and electro-acoustic music. He is the recipient of various awards including the 40th Irino Prize for Chamber Music, the Outstanding Artist Award for Music of the Austrian Ministry of Culture, and the 2021 Salvatore Martirano Memorial Composition Award. In 2014, Beat Furrer wrote: "The craftsmanship and form of his music unite to create an extraordinarily inspired art".

Biography 
Utku Asuroglu received his musical studies from the Codarts University for the Arts, University of Music and Performing Arts Graz, Freiburg Conservatory of Music and is currently a doctoral candidate at Stanford University. During these years he studied with Brian Ferneyhough, Clemens Gadenstätter and Gérard Pesson.

He won the 40th Irino Prize in 2019 and the Outstanding Artist Award for Music of the Austrian Ministry of Culture in 2016. He was a nominated finalist for the Gaudeamus Award in 2015, the Goethe Institute’s Asian Composers Showcase in 2016.

Notable festivals commissioning and featuring Asuroglu's works include Darmstädter Ferienkurse, Donaueschinger Musiktage, Gaudeamus Muziekweek, Wittener Tage für neue Kammermusik, Schleswig-Holstein, Manifeste IRCAM, MATA Festival and ISCM World Music Days.

A selection of his works can be found on the website of German contemporary music publisher Edition Gravis.

Discography 
Studio albums

 Chest of Toys (2018, Coviello)
 includes Hayirli Olsun for small ensemble
 Riot Ensemble
 Turkish Recital (2018, Antre Music)
 includes Karli Kayin Ormaninda for clarinet and piano
 Emirhan Tuga, Edzo Bos

References

External links 
 Official website

Turkish composers
Living people
Musicians from Istanbul
1986 births